Dixon Run is a  long 1st order tributary to Little Wheeling Creek in Ohio County, West Virginia.

Course 
Dixon Run rises about 2 miles southeast of Clinton, West Virginia, in Ohio County and then flows southeast to join Little Wheeling Creek about 0.5 miles southwest of Point Mills.

Watershed 
Dixon Run drains  of area, receives about 40.9 in/year of precipitation, has a wetness index of 282.60, and is about 82% forested.

See also 
 List of rivers of West Virginia

References 

Rivers of Ohio County, West Virginia
Rivers of West Virginia